Cavaglia is a hamlet on the western flank of the Val Poschiavo in the canton of Graubünden, Switzerland. In 2005, Cavaglia's permanent population was 24.

Cavaglia railway station is a stop on the Bernina railway, which forms part of the Rhaetian Railway in the Albula/Bernina Landscapes, a UNESCO World Heritage Site. Tourist attractions include a nature trail and a group of deep potholes formed by glacial moulins, as well as other glacial formations.

The  tunnel connecting the two plants also accommodates a funicular railway that is open to the public during tours of the plants.

References

Poschiavo